India Today is a weekly Indian English-language news magazine published by Living Media India Limited. It is the most widely circulated magazine in India, with a readership of close to 8 million. In 2014, India Today launched a new online opinion-orientated site called the DailyO.

History
India Today was established in 1975 by Vidya Vilas Purie (owner of Thompson Press), with his daughter Madhu Trehan as its editor and his son Aroon Purie as its publisher. At present, India Today is also published in Hindi, Tamil, Malayalam and Telugu. The India Today news channel was launched on 22 May 2015.

In October 2017, Aroon Purie passed control of the India Today Group to his daughter, Kallie Purie.

References

External links
 Official website

1975 establishments in Uttar Pradesh
English-language magazines published in India
India Today Group
News magazines published in India
Weekly magazines published in India
Magazines established in 1975
Multilingual magazines
Weekly news magazines